Mobile Home Construction and Safety Standards Act of 1974 or National Mobile Home Construction and Safety Standards Act is a United States federal law establishing design and development safety standards for manufactured housing or prefabricated homes. The codified law authorized stipulations whereas any proposed safety standard shall be equitable for a particular type of mobile home with consideration of additional cost liabilities for the future homeownership. The Act of Congress endorsed violative civil penalties and judicial review of Federal mobile home construction and safety standards developed by the United States Department of Housing and Urban Development. The Act mandated the establishment of the National Mobile Home Advisory Council and National Mobile Home Administration.

The S. 2538 legislation appended the Housing and Community Development Act of 1974 on February 27, 1974. The Housing and Community Development Act of 1974 was a significant congressional amendment to the Housing Act of 1937. The United States housing authorization bill was passed by the United States 93rd Congressional session and enacted into law by the 38th President of the United States Gerald Ford on August 22, 1974.

Amendments to 1974 Act
Congressional amendments to the Mobile Home Construction and Safety Standards Act.

See also

 Construction trailer
 Manufactured Housing Institute
 Modular home
 Travel Trailer
 Truck camper

External links
 
 
 
 
 

1974 in law
93rd United States Congress
United States federal housing legislation
Mortgage industry of the United States
Community development
Urban economics
Urban politics in the United States
1974 in the United States
Safety
Portable buildings and shelters